Baron Fisher, of Kilverstone in the County of Norfolk, is a title in the Peerage of the United Kingdom. It was created in 1909 for the noted naval reformer Admiral of the Fleet Sir John Fisher.

His son Cecil Fisher, the second Baron, was the adoptive heir of Josiah Vavasseur (1834–1908), an arms manufacturer. Vavasseur left part of his enormous estate to Fisher on the condition that he adopted the Vavasseur name. Fisher assumed the additional surname of Vavasseur in 1909 by Royal licence.  the title is held by the latter's grandson, the fourth Baron, who succeeded in 2012.

The family seat is Kilverstone Hall, near Kilverstone, Norfolk.

Line of succession

  John Arbuthnot Fisher, 1st Baron Fisher (1841–1920)
  Cecil Vavasseur Fisher, 2nd Baron Fisher (1868–1955)
  John Vavasseur Fisher, 3rd Baron Fisher (1921–2012)
  Patrick Vavasseur Fisher, 4th Baron Fisher (b. 1953)
 (1) Hon. Benjamin Carnegie Vavasseur Fisher (b. 1986)
 (2) Hon. Robin Carnegie Vavasseur Fisher (b. 1996)
 (3) Hon. Benjamin Vavasseur Fisher (b. 1958)
 (4) Peter Vavasseur Fisher (b. 1986)

The heir apparent is the present holder's second son, the Hon. Benjamin Carnegie Vavasseur Fisher (b. 1986), who is married to Katy Lee Fisher. His elder brother, the Hon. John Carnegie Vavasseur Fisher (b. 1979), died on 2 August 2015.

References

Kidd, Charles, Williamson, David (editors). Debrett's Peerage and Baronetage (1990 edition). New York: St Martin's Press, 1990.

Footnotes

Baronies in the Peerage of the United Kingdom
Noble titles created in 1909